Mirai may refer to:

Computing
 Mirai (software), 3D creation and editing suite
 Mirai (malware), used for launching distributed denial-of-service attacks

Transportation
 RV Mirai, a Japanese oceanographic research vessel
 Toyota Mirai, a hydrogen fuel cell vehicle

Other uses
 Miraí, a municipality in Minas Gerais, Brazil
 Mirai (given name), a Japanese given name
 Mirai (wrestler), Japanese professional wrestler
 JDS Mirai, a fictional helicopter missile destroyer of the Japan Maritime Self-Defense Force
 Mirai (song), a 2013 song by Kylee
 "Mirai", a 2021 song by L'Arc-en-Ciel
 Mirai (film), a 2018 Japanese animated film
 Mirai, the ending theme of Gunslinger Stratos by the Japanese music group Garnidelia
 Mirai, a Singaporean girl group which included Olivia Ong

See also
 Mirai Nikki, the Japanese name for the manga and anime Future Diary
 Mirai Sentai Timeranger, the 2000 Tokusatsu Super Sentai series
 "Mirai e...", a 1998 song by Himeka
 Mirai Ninja (disambiguation)
 Hatsune Miku and Future Stars: Project Mirai, a 2012 rhythm game